is a professional Japanese baseball player. He plays outfielder for the Tokyo Yakult Swallows.

External links

 NPB.com

1993 births
Living people
Baseball people from Wakayama Prefecture
People from Kinokawa, Wakayama
Nihon University alumni
Japanese baseball players
Nippon Professional Baseball outfielders
Tokyo Yakult Swallows players